Yunnan Tin Group (Holding) Company Limited (YTC) is the largest tin producer and exporter in China and the world. It is headquartered in Kunming, Yunnan. It involves in the production, processing and export of tin metal, and also for the production of tin-based and arsenic-based chemicals. It was established in 1883 by the Government of Qing Dynasty as the Gejiu Manufacture & Commercial Bureau (China Merchants).

It owns two listed subsidiaries, Yunnan Tin Company Limited and Sino-Platinum Metals Company Limited. It was established in 1998 and listed on the Shenzhen Stock Exchange in 2000. It is the only stock company in the Chinese tin industry.

External links
Yunnan Tin Group (Holding) Company Limited
Yunnan Tin Company Limited

References

Holding companies of China
Metal companies of China
Mining companies of China
Government-owned companies of China
Companies based in Kunming
Non-renewable resource companies established in 1883
China Merchants
Chinese companies established in 1883